Christian Gonzalo Limousin (born 29 November 1991) is an Argentine professional footballer who plays as a goalkeeper for Cantolao.

Career
Ferro Carril Oeste were Limousin's first team. Mario Gómez was the manager who promoted Limousin into their senior squad, with the goalkeeper appearing on the substitute's bench nine times before making his professional debut on 18 June 2011 against Unión Santa Fe in Primera B Nacional. His tenure with the club lasted a total of seven seasons, with Limousin appearing sixty-three times in all competitions. Fellow second tier side Almagro completed the signing of Limousin on 7 July 2016. Forty-three appearances came in his first season, which preceded twenty-six in 2017–18 as they lost in the championship play-off.

On 30 June 2018, Limousin joined Gimnasia y Esgrima. He made his bow for them on 29 July in the Copa Argentina round of sixty-four, as Gimnasia y Esgrima were eliminated by his former club Almagro. Limousin moved to Ecuador's Técnico Universitario on 13 January 2019. He left in the succeeding July, having played five matches in Serie A. On 8 July, Limousin sealed a return to Almagro. He departed twelve months later, following eighteen appearances. In January 2021, Limousin headed to Peru with Cantolao.

Career statistics
.

References

External links

1991 births
Living people
Footballers from Buenos Aires
Argentine footballers
Association football goalkeepers
Argentine expatriate footballers
Expatriate footballers in Ecuador
Expatriate footballers in Peru
Argentine expatriate sportspeople in Ecuador
Argentine expatriate sportspeople in Peru
Primera Nacional players
Ecuadorian Serie A players
Club Almagro players
Ferro Carril Oeste footballers
Gimnasia y Esgrima de Jujuy footballers
C.D. Técnico Universitario footballers
Academia Deportiva Cantolao players